Blue Pony is an album by the American musician Julie Miller, released in 1997. It was Miller's first album of secular music.

Miller supported the album by touring with Emmylou Harris.

Production
The album was produced by Julie and Buddy Miller. It was recorded in the Millers' Nashville dining room. Steve Earle sang on "I Call on You", Emmylou Harris on "Forever My Beloved". "Face of Appalachia" is a cover of the John Sebastian/Lowell George song. "Dancing Girl" is about child prostitution in Thailand.

Critical reception

The Washington Post wrote that "the songs are given mostly acoustic, string-band arrangements that take on a chamber-music flavor when violinist Tammy Rogers or cellist Matt Slocum join in." Entertainment Weekly deemed the album "one of the year’s most haunting surprises," writing that Miller is "armed with dark, poetic lyrics about betrayal, redemption, and the damage caused by long-held secrets." The Los Angeles Times called it "a touching, poetic album that is among the year's strongest progressive-country releases."

The Atlanta Journal-Constitution determined that "with a winsome voice pitched somewhere between innocence and experience, Julie Miller's debut is smart, heartfelt and catchy as hell." The Los Angeles Daily News opined that "Miller's gorgeous record has a steely center." The Philadelphia Inquirer labeled it "a mix of exquisite songwriting, Appalachian yearning and up-to-the-minute ethereality."

AllMusic called the album "a wonderful slice of contemporary country that draws heavily on both folk and rock music."

Track listing

References

Julie Miller albums
1997 albums
HighTone Records albums